Claire Simone Terblanche (born 20 October 1984) is a South African former cricketer and cricket coach. She played as a right-handed batter, right-arm off break bowler and occasional wicket-keeper. She appeared in one Test match, 21 One Day Internationals and five Twenty20 Internationals for South Africa between 2003 and 2009. She played domestic cricket for Eastern Province and Boland.

She was named as the Head Coach of Starlights for the inaugural season of the Women's T20 Super League, and has coached the side ever since.

References

External links
 
 

1984 births
Living people
Cricketers from Port Elizabeth
South African women cricketers
South Africa women Test cricketers
South Africa women One Day International cricketers
South Africa women Twenty20 International cricketers
Eastern Province women cricketers
Boland women cricketers
South African cricket coaches